Marco Boni (Camposampiero, 21 May 1984) is an Italian pole vaulter.

Biography
In 2012 he qualified, with his personal best of 5.60 m, for the 2012 European Athletics Championships in Helsinki.

Achievements

Personal best
Pole vault: 5.60 m (Fermo, 4 March 2012)

References

External links
 

1984 births
Italian male pole vaulters
Living people
Athletics competitors of Centro Sportivo Aeronautica Militare